Dvuyakornaya Formation is a geological formation from the Cretaceous period in Crimea, south of Yalta. Remains found there include: ammonites, such as Berriasella, and brachiopods.

Footnotes

Geography of Crimea
Geography of Russia